The 2017 Outback Bowl was an American college football bowl game played on Monday, January 2, 2017 at Raymond James Stadium in Tampa, Florida.  The 31st annual Outback Bowl featured the Iowa Hawkeyes from the Big Ten Conference and the Florida Gators from the Southeastern Conference, and was one of the 2016–17 NCAA football bowl games concluding the 2016 NCAA Division I FBS football season.  The game was nationally televised by ABC, and its title sponsor was the Outback Steakhouse restaurant franchise.

Teams
On December 4, 2016, Florida and Iowa were selected to play one another. This was the fourth overall meeting between the teams, and was the third time the Gators and Hawkeyes played each other in the Outback Bowl, with each team having won one of the previous meetings. This was also the fifth time each school played in the Outback Bowl.

Florida

Iowa

Game summary

Scoring summary

Statistics

References

2016–17 NCAA football bowl games
2017
2017 Outback Bowl
2017 Outback Bowl
2017 in sports in Florida
January 2017 sports events in the United States